The 12675 / 12676 Kovai Express is a daily superfast express train on Indian Railways, running between Puratchi Thalaivar Dr. M.G. Ramachandran Central Railway Station and Coimbatore Junction.  The train made its inaugural run on 14 April 1977 and was one of the fastest Express trains in India, with an average speed of 65 km/hr including stops .  It is also one of the most prestigious trains of Southern Railway.

Service 
This train is an all day, day time superfast and has a Chair Car (Coach) seating arrangement with air-conditioned and non-air conditioned coaches and Pantry car. The 12679/12680 Puratchi Thalaivar Dr. M.G. Ramachandran Chennai Central Railway Station - Coimbatore Junction Intercity Superfast Express is its opposite route partner.

Route and Stations 
Kovai Express, or popularly referred to as Kovai, connects Tamil Nadu's state capital Chennai and its second largest city  Coimbatore, a major textile, educational and engineering center. This train covers 6 corporation cities out of 12 in the state: Chennai, Vellore, Salem, Erode, Tiruppur and Coimbatore. The route covers most of the major industrial hubs in the north west part of Tamil Nadu. En route, starting from Coimbatore, it covers important towns of Tirupur, an international hosiery goods exporting town, Erode, a principle agricultural and major Industrial town, Salem which is a major steel  and mineral town, Morappur, a station that serves passengers from Dharmapuri and surrounding areas, major leather goods exporting centers Ambur, Vaniyambadi, Arakkonam Junction The National Disaster Response Force (NDRF), INS Rajali Naval Air Station and Vellore-Katpadi which has both a medical center a university.

Rake 
Kovai Express contains a total number of 22 LHB coach. Previously it has a single dedicated rake unit but now It's rakes are being shared with Brindhavan Express. It's rakes are maintained at GSN yard, Bainbridge, Chennai. The current composition is as follows:

Historic information
The old number was 75/76, later changed in 80's to 2675/2676, as per new four digit format numbering system later adopted by the Indian Railways. From December 2011 onwards 5 digit train number system was introduced all over India and accordingly Kovai express train number was again changed as 12675/12676.
In 1978 it was pulled by a Diesel Engine with Kovai Express Boldly written on it. It used to start from Chennai at 6 A.M and its next stop was Katpadi arriving at 7.43 A.M. Other stops at that time was Jolarpet, Salem, Erode, Tiruppur and Coimbatore. It use to reach Cbe at 2 p.m. and start back at 2.20 p.m. Now Shatabdi Express has taken over the Kovai express timings.

Time Table
MAS 》CBE  12675

CBE 》MAS   12676

See also
Famous trains
The Grand Trunk Express
Pallavan Express
Nellai Express
Rockfort Express
Pandian Express
Pearl City Express
Tamil Nadu Express
Cheran Express

References

External links
Kovai Express Route

Transport in Chennai
Named passenger trains of India
Express trains in India
Transport in Coimbatore
Rail transport in Tamil Nadu
Railway services introduced in 1977